The United States House of Representatives elections in California, 1938 was an election for California's delegation to the United States House of Representatives, which occurred as part of the general election of the House of Representatives on November 8, 1938. Republicans gained four districts. Franck R. Havenner, first elected to Congress as a Progressive, was elected for the rest of his House career as a Democrat.

Overview

Delegation composition

Results
Final results from the Clerk of the House of Representatives:

District 1

District 2

District 3

District 4

District 5

District 6

District 7

District 8

District 9

District 10

District 11

District 12

District 13

District 14

District 15

District 16

District 17

District 18

District 19

District 20

See also
76th United States Congress
Political party strength in California
Political party strength in U.S. states
1938 United States House of Representatives elections

References
California Elections Page
Office of the Clerk of the House of Representatives

External links
California Legislative District Maps (1911-Present)
RAND California Election Returns: District Definitions

1938
California United States House of Representatives
1938 California elections